Spartopteryx is a monotypic moth genus in the family Geometridae erected by Achille Guenée in 1858. Its only species, Spartopteryx kindermannaria, was first described by Otto Staudinger in 1871.

References

Boarmiini